Sturgeon government can refer to
First Sturgeon government, the Scottish Government led by Nicola Sturgeon from 2014 to 2016
Second Sturgeon government, the Scottish Government led by Nicola Sturgeon from 2016 to 2021
Third Sturgeon government, the Scottish Government led by Nicola Sturgeon since 2021